Adra Ramchandrapur is a village in Comilla District in the Chittagong Division of eastern Bangladesh.

References

Villages in Chandpur District
Villages in Chittagong Division